Sparks is an English surname of Old Norse origin.

Notable people with the surname
 Alf Sparks (1903–1954), Australian rules footballer
 Allister Sparks (1933–2016), South African writer, journalist, and political commentator
 Anthony Sparks, American screenwriter
 Bailey Sparks (born 2002), American soccer player
 Barry Sparks (born 1968), American bassist
 Beatrice Sparks (1917–2012), American therapist 
 Bill Sparks (1922–2002), British WWII Royal Marine
 Bradley Sparks (born 1967), Australian rules footballer
 Brian Sparks (1931–2013), Welsh rugby footballer
 Catriona Sparks (born 1965), Australian writer
 Chauncey Sparks (1884–1968), American politician and attorney  
 Cliff Sparks (1896–1975), American football player
 Clinton Sparks (born 1979), American DJ, songwriter, recording artist, and television personality
 Corrine Sparks, Canadian judge
 Dan Sparks (born 1968), American politician
 Dan Sparks (basketball) (born 1944), American basketball player
 Dana Sparks, American actor
 Daniel Sparks (politician) (born 1974), American politician
 Dave Sparks (1928–1954), American football player 
 Donita Sparks (born 1963), American singer and guitarist
 Douglas Sparks (born 1956), American Episcopal bishop
 Evert Sparks (1879–1972), Canadian politician
 Felix L. Sparks (1917–2007), American military commander
 G. Sparks (Surrey cricketer)
 Garret Sparks (born 1993), American ice hockey goaltender 
 Greg Sparks (born 1964), American baseball coach
 Hal Sparks (born 1969), American actor, comedian, musician, political commentator, and television personality
 Hedley Sparks (1908–1996), British biblical scholar and Church of England priest
 Henry Sparks (1845–1900), Australian businessman
 Isaac Sparks (1719-1776), Irish stage actor
 Jamie Sparks (born 1992), British rower
 Jamie Sparks (singer), Canadian singer
 Jared Sparks (1789–1866), American historian, educator, and minister
 Jeff Sparks (born 1972), American baseball player
 Joe Sparks (coach) (born 1938), American baseball player and coach
 Joe Sparks (video game developer), American video game developer, animator, songwriter, web publisher, and guitarist
 John Sparks (disambiguation), multiple people 
 Jordin Sparks (born 1989), American singer, songwriter, and actress
 Joseph Sparks (1901–1981), British trade unionist and politician
 K. Sparks, American rapper
 Ken Sparks (1944–2007), American football coach and player
 Kerrelyn Sparks, American author
 Larry Sparks (born 1947), American singer and guitarist
 Lindsay Sparks (born 1944), New Zealand cricketer
 Luke Sparks (1711-1768), Irish stage actor
 Mark Sparks (born 1960), American flautist
 Maxwell Nicholas Sparks (1920–2013), Royal New Zealand Air Force and Royal Air Force pilot
 Melvin Sparks (1946–2011), American guitarist
 Mike Sparks (born 1967), American politician
 Morgan Sparks (1916–2008), American scientist
 Ned Sparks (1883–1957), Canadian actor
 Nicholas Sparks (born 1965), American author
 Nicholas Sparks (politician) (1794–1862), Irish Canadian politician and landowner
 Omillio Sparks (born 1979), American rapper
 Paul Sparks (born 1971), American actor
 Percy Sparks (1880–1959), Canadian manufacturer and environmentalist
 Phillippi Sparks (born 1969), American football player
 Randy Sparks (born 1933), American musician
 Richard Sparks (born 1950), American conductor
 Robert Sparks (born 1947), American handball player
 Robert Stewart Sparks (1871–1932), American politician
 Ron Sparks (disambiguation), multiple people 
 Sam Sparks (born 1939), American judge
 Sarah Sparks (1754–1837), British stage actress
 Stephanie Sparks (born 1973), American golfer
 Steve Sparks (disambiguation), multiple people 
 Shane Sparks (born 1969), American hip-hop choreographer
 Theodore Austin-Sparks (1888–1971), British author and minister
 Theresa Sparks (born 1949), American civil rights activist
 Tim Sparks (born 1954), American musician
 Tommy Sparks (born 1986), British singer and songwriter
 Tori Sparks (born 1983), American singer-songwriter
 Tryphena Sparks (1851–1890), Thomas Hardy's cousin and possible lover
 Tully Sparks (1874–1937), American baseball player
 Vicki Sparks, British sports journalist and football commentator
 Will Sparks (born 1993), Australian DJ and producer
 Will Sparks (painter) (1862–1937), American painter
 William Sparks (disambiguation), multiple people

Fictional characters
Georgina Sparks, a character in the Gossip Girl novels and television series
Jenny Sparks, a character in the Wildstorm comic book universe
Sam Sparks, a character in the Cloudy with a Chance of Meatballs franchise

References

English-language surnames